Perris is an old railway city in Riverside County, California, United States, located  east-southeast of Los Angeles and  north of San Diego. It is known for Lake Perris, an artificial lake, skydiving, and its sunny dry climate. Perris is within the Inland Empire metropolitan area of Southern California. Perris had a population of 78,700 as of the 2020 census.

History
The coming of the California Southern Railroad led to the founding of the city around the new depot, on the rail connection between the present-day cities of Barstow and San Diego. The Perris Depot is included in the Library of Congress’ Historic American Buildings Survey. Due to a land title dispute at Pinacate, most of its citizens moved two miles north on the railroad and established Perris in 1885. The city is named in honor of Fred T. Perris, chief engineer of the California Southern Railroad.The city of Perris was incorporated in 1911. It originally was within San Diego County but, in 1892, it was transferred to the newly established Riverside County. 

In 2005, the National Archives and Records Administration opened the National Archives at Riverside, which is its regional branch for federal documents relating to the Pacific Region (Arizona, southern California, and Clark County, Nevada) in Perris.

Turpin family

In January 2018, authorities discovered 13 malnourished siblings held captive by their own parents, David Allen Turpin, 57, and Louise Anna Turpin, 49, in a home in Perris. Some of the siblings were adults, as old as 29.  In April 2019, the couple was sentenced to life imprisonment with no possibility of parole for 25 years.

Geography

Climate

Perris has a Mediterranean climate, with long, hot summers and short, mild winters. The climate in this area is described by the Köppen Climate Classification System as "dry-summer subtropical" often referred to as "Mediterranean" and abbreviated as Csa.

Demographics

2010
At the 2010 census Perris had a population of 68,386. The racial makeup of Perris was 28,937 (42.3%) White (11.0% Non-Hispanic White), 8,307 (12.1%) African American, 589 (0.9%) Native American, 2,461 (3.6%) Asian, 286 (0.4%) Pacific Islander, 24,345 (35.6%) from other races, and 3,461 (5.1%) from two or more races. Hispanic or Latino of any race were 49,079 persons (71.8%).

The census reported that 68,146 people (99.7% of the population) lived in households, 140 (0.2%) lived in non-institutionalized group quarters, and 100 (0.1%) were institutionalized.

There were 16,365 households: 10,836 (66.2%) had children under the age of 18 living in them; 9,778 (59.7%) were opposite-sex married couples living together; 3,128 (19.1%) had a female householder with no husband present; 1,441 (8.8%) had a male householder with no wife present. There were 1,314 (8.0%) unmarried opposite-sex partnerships, and 120 (0.7%) same-sex married couples or partnerships. 1,442 households (8.8%) were one person and 383 (2.3%) had someone living alone who was 65 or older. The average household size was 4.16. There were 14,347 families (87.7% of households); the average family size was 4.32.

The age distribution was 25,288 people (37.0%) under the age of 18, 7,951 people (11.6%) aged 18 to 24, 20,088 people (29.4%) aged 25 to 44, 11,711 people (17.1%) aged 45 to 64, and 3,348 people (4.9%) who were 65 or older. The median age was 25.9 years. For every 100 females, there were 98.3 males. For every 100 females age 18 and over, there were 93.9 males.

There were 17,906 housing units at an average density of 568.4 per square mile, of the occupied units 10,854 (66.3%) were owner-occupied and 5,511 (33.7%) were rented. The homeowner vacancy rate was 5.5%; the rental vacancy rate was 6.8%. 44,695 people (65.4% of the population) lived in owner-occupied housing units and 23,451 people (34.3%) lived in rental housing units.

According to the 2010 United States Census, Perris had a median household income of $46,435, with 28.2% of the population living below the federal poverty line.

2000
At the 2000 census, there were 36,189 people in 9,652 households, including 8,117 families, in the city. The racial makeup of the city was predominately Hispanic, with figures as follows: 22% White, 30.9% African American, 1.5% Native American, 2.8% Asian, 0.3% Pacific Islander, 32.6% from other races, and 5.8% from two or more races. Hispanic or Latino of any race were 76.2% of the population.

The median household income was $35,522, and the median family income was $36,063. Males had a median income of $31,891 versus $24,634 for females. The per capita income for the city was $11,425. About 18.1% of families and 20.4% of the population were below the poverty line, including 25.3% of those under age 18 and 14.2% of those age 65 or over.

Of the 9,652 households 56.8% had children under the age of 18 living with them, 58.2% were married couples living together, 18.8% had a female householder with no husband present, and 15.9% were non-families. 12.2% of households were one person and 4.5% were one person aged 65 or older. The average household size was 3.7 and the average family size was 4.0.

The age distribution was 39.6% under the age of 18, 9.9% from 18 to 24, 30.8% from 25 to 44, 13.5% from 45 to 64, and 6.2% 65 or older. The median age was 25 years. Perris' large, youthful demographics are a result of families moving into the city's new housing tracts. For every 100 females, there were 96.1 males. For every 100 females age 18 and over, there were 92.2 males.

Economy

Top employers
According to Perris's 2021 Comprehensive Annual Financial Report, the top employers in the city are:

Arts and culture
The Southern California Railway Museum is the largest operating museum of its kind on the West Coast of the United States. The Southern California Fair has been held at the Lake Perris Fairgrounds since 1987.

The Farmer Boys restaurant chain, which has many locations throughout the Inland Empire, was started in Perris in 1981.

Rock Castle house is set on a hill above town.

Government

Education

The city is served by three school districts: the Perris Elementary School District, the Perris Union High School District (which also serves Menifee), and the Val Verde Unified School District, which also serves the southern part of Moreno Valley. Perris High School of the Perris district is the city's first public (grades 9–12) school. Established in 1887, the school was relocated in 1961, and the school's western annex on I-215 and Nuevo Road became a Continuation High School in 1993. Now, there are more high schools in the area, including Citrus Hill and Orange Vista of the Val Verde district.

Middle schools include Pinacate, Lakeside, Perris and Tomas Rivera. There are ten elementary (grades K–6) schools.

Infrastructure

Aviation
The nearby, privately owned, Perris Valley Airport (FAA designator: L65) has a  runway. Perris has drawn a crowd of skydivers, amateur and professional, to Perris Valley Skydiving. The area's sudden fame gave Perris the nickname: "the skydiving capital of America". On April 22, 1992, a de Havilland Twin Otter crashed during takeoff at Perris Valley after an engine lost power. The National Transportation Safety Board determined that the accident was caused by contaminated fuel obtained from the improper handling of the airfield's fuel tanks and the pilot's improper actions after the power loss, as well as other factors. The aircraft never rose above 50 feet and 14 parachutists and the two pilots were killed.

Highways
Perris is served by Interstate 215 which runs from Murrieta to the south to San Bernardino to the north, and by State Route 74, which serves Lake Elsinore and Orange County to the west, and the San Jacinto and Coachella valleys to the east.

Public safety
The Riverside County Sheriff's Department provides police services to the entire Perris Valley area (including the nearby communities of Mead Valley and Glen Valley, and the cities of Canyon Lake and Menifee) from its regional station on 4th Street (in the former headquarters of the now-disbanded Perris Police Department).

The city of Perris contracts for fire and paramedic services with the Riverside County Fire Department through a cooperative agreement with CAL FIRE. The CAL FIRE/Riverside County Fire Department headquarters is located in Perris.

The California State Parks have a dispatch center located in the city as well – Southern Communications Center (SURCOM). Communications Centers operate multi-frequency/channel radio systems, law enforcement telecommunications systems (CLETS), computer terminals, and associated equipment to dispatch law enforcement/emergency response units and coordinate services with field personnel and other agencies.

Commuter Rail

In June 2016, the 91 Line of the Metrolink commuter rail system was extended from Riverside to Perris, connecting it to downtown Los Angeles and the rest of the Greater Los Angeles megalopolis with two stations. Future expansion to Hemet has also been discussed.

Cemetery
The Perris Valley Cemetery District maintains the Perris Valley Cemetery.

Notable people 
 Louis B. Mayer – Hollywood film mogul, owned a horse ranch in Perris
 Alfred E. Green - film director, born in Perris
 Danny Harris – former Olympic hurdler, silver medalist in the 1984 Los Angeles Olympic Games and the 1987 World Championships in Rome. Grew up in Perris and alumnus of Perris High School.

See also
 Perris Valley Historical and Museum Association
 Lake Perris

References

External links

 
 

 
Cities in Riverside County, California
Incorporated cities and towns in California
Populated places established in 1885
1885 establishments in California